Sitakunda Botanical Garden and Eco Park is a park located in Sitakunda Upazila of Chittagong District in south-eastern Bangladesh. It is a beautiful place where you can find peace among the sound of birds chirping. A perfect destination to travel with friends and family and enjoy the nature within. The Sohosrodhara Jhorna is the most popular attraction in this park.

History 
This is the first eco-park in Bangladesh. It was established in 2001 on 808 hectares. The main purposes of creating such eco parks are storing biodiversity, conservation.

Area and location
The Sitakunda Botanical Garden and Eco Park is located along the Dhaka–Chittagong Highway in Sitakunda Upazila, Sitakunda, Chittagong.

Key attractions 
 The Sohosdhara Jhorna is a popular attraction there for locals and people who travel there.

Facilities
Presently there are parking lots for Eco Park. Toilet facilities are available for free in three locations. There is a plant nursery selling Bangladeshi and foreign plants.

Gallery

References

External links

Infgentaconnect.com
Distancesfrom.com

Geography of Chittagong
Botanical gardens in Bangladesh